Highland Park distillery is the second northernmost single malt Scotch whisky distillery in Scotland (Kimbland distillery on Sanday being 22 miles further north), located in Kirkwall on the Orkney Islands.

History
Highland Park distillery was founded by Magnus Eunson, a butcher and church officer by day and illicit distiller and whisky smuggler by night. In 1798 he was caught illegally distilling whisky on the site. In 1826, nearly 30 years later, Highland Park received an official licence to distill whisky.

The name of the distillery does not refer to the Scottish Highlands, but rather to the fact that the distillery was founded on an area called 'High Park' distinguished from a lower area nearby.

In February 2023, Highland Park released a 54-year-old Single Malt Scotch whisky to celebrate Highland Park’s 225th anniversary.

Production 
The distilling process at Highland Park is the same as that used at other distilleries.

Highland Park uses the local peat, which contains a higher proportion of heather than many other peats. The whisky is aged in sherry casks made of either American or European oak, purchased from Oloroso sherry producers in Spain.

Awards 
Highland Park has been named "The Best Spirit in the World" on three occasions by F. Paul Pacult, America's foremost expert on distilled spirits. Its 25-year-old whisky was the first spirit ever to receive a perfect 100-point score at the Ultimate Spirits Challenge. In 2018, two of its special distillery releases, The Light and The Dark, were each awarded a Double Gold medal in the San Francisco World Spirits Competition. In 2019 and for the fourth year running, Highland Park won the Chairman's Trophy for Best in Category at the Ultimate Spirits Challenge.

In 2018, Highland Park ranked second, behind sister distillery The Macallan, in whisky auction sales driven by growing demand from whisky collectors for the distillery's special releases.

See also
List of distilleries in Scotland
List of whisky brands

References

Notes

External links
 Official website

Distilleries in Scotland
Scottish malt whisky
Food and drink companies established in 1798
Scottish brands
1798 establishments in Scotland
Kirkwall